The Columbia Daily Spectator (known colloquially as the Spec) is the student newspaper of Columbia University. Founded in 1877, it is the oldest continuously operating college news daily in the nation after The Harvard Crimson, and has been legally independent of the university since 1962. It is published at 120th Street and Claremont Avenue in New York City. During the academic term, it is published online Sunday through Thursday and printed twice monthly. In addition to serving as a campus newspaper, the Spectator also reports the latest news of the surrounding Morningside Heights community. The paper is delivered to over 150 locations throughout the Morningside Heights neighborhood.

History 

The Columbia Spectator was founded in 1877 by Frederick William Holls and H.G. Paine. Also serving on the paper's first editorial board was William Barclay Parsons. Several attempts at student journalism were made before the Spectator. The first student publication formed at Columbia was the short lived Philolexian Observer, founded in 1813. The Cap and Gown was founded in 1867 as both a student newspaper and literary publication. It was renamed to the Acta Columbiana in 1873, and was absorbed by the Spectator in 1885, which also took its motto, A Studentibus Studentibusque.

The Spectator was first published as a fortnightly. In 1898 it became a weekly, and a year later began to be published semi-weekly, before finally becoming a daily paper in 1902.

In April 2014, Spectator announced it would become the first Ivy League newspaper to cut its daily print for a weekly distribution to focus on digital content and increase revenue. The plan was approved shortly thereafter by the Board of Trustees, passing 7 to 4. John R. MacArthur, one of the members of the board, resigned in protest of the decision, but the paper did see the expected revenue increase.

Organization
Spectator is published by Spectator Publishing Company Inc, an independent 501(c)(3) corporation. Spectator Publishing Company was formed in 1962 and has been independent of Columbia University since then. The president of the Spectator Publishing Company also serves as the editor in chief of the Columbia Daily Spectator.

Spectator'''s writing departments, each headed by one or two editors, include campus news, city news, sports, arts and entertainment, and opinion. The other non-writing departments, also headed by their own respective editors, include photography, illustrations, graphics, copy, and business. The Business & Innovations departments, which oversee the newspaper's advertising, finances, and alumni relations, are headed by the publisher.

The paper is currently run by the 147th managing board. First-time writers at Columbia begin their time at the paper with a 1- to 2-month trial period, during which they learn the basics of writing an article and publish their first articles. Each November and December, students run for positions at the paper, a process that takes nearly a month. They begin by shadowing, or sitting with the current editors or associate editors and learning the editing process. Next they write proposals for their desired position. The students then take editing tests created by their department editor that test them on fundamentals. Finally, they complete the Turkeyshoots process with an interview. The results of the process, including the new managing board, are announced in mid-December, the weekend before finals.

Recent spinoffs
In 2005, Spec started printing La Página, a weekly flyer in Spanish with translations of some of the week's English content most relevant to neighborhood readers. It folded within the year.

The next year, in February 2006, the paper launched a series of blogs, SpecBlogs. It was the third Ivy League paper to do this, after The Harvard Crimson's Sports Blog (December 2005) and The Daily Pennsylvanian's TheBuzz (January 2006).

In September 2006, Spectator staff launched The Eye, a weekly magazine featuring investigative pieces and commentary on Columbia and New York City. The name of The Eye relates both to the fact that one "spectates" with it and urban theorist Jane Jacobs' notion that "eyes on the street" help keep neighborhoods safe.

In March 2010, Spec launched a new blog, Spectrum, which is updated several times a day with breaking news, columns, and features.

In January 2018, Spec launched a branded content studio, Spectator Brand Studios. It was the second Ivy League paper to do this, after the Harvard Crimson.ControversiesSpectator has been criticized publicly by staff members over the years for obscuring its election procedures. On October 16, 2009, Ryan Bubinski, then the online editor of Spec, shut down the website in protest of a constitutional violation. The website was restored on the 18th, and Bubinski left the staff of the newspaper. The lack of a constitution brought renewed protests in 2018 when concerns over potential prior misconduct of a staffer surfaced during the Turkeyshoots process. The Corporate Board of Spectator'' followed an internal policy to investigate the claims, which was not made public to staffers. Following the Turkeyshoots season, the majority of the newspaper's Sports section resigned in protest.

In 2018 and 2019, work by journalists at the paper played an important role in uncovering the plagiarism scandal around Charles K. Armstrong, a professor of history at Columbia University. It also, in 2019, found that a number of professors accused or found guilty of sexual misconduct remained on campus, breaking news that English professor Michael Golston had been found guilty of sexually assaulting a student.

Recent leadership

Notable Spec alumni

See also
 Morningside Heights
 List of New York City newspapers and magazines

References

External links
 Columbia Daily Spectator online
 
 
 Spectator Publishing Company
 Columbia Daily Spectator archive

Columbia University publications
Student newspapers published in New York (state)
Publications established in 1877
1877 establishments in New York (state)